Lewisville is an unincorporated community in Elk Township in Chester County, Pennsylvania, United States. Lewisville is located at the intersection of Pennsylvania Route 472 and Pennsylvania Route 841 just north of the Maryland border.

References

Unincorporated communities in Chester County, Pennsylvania
Unincorporated communities in Pennsylvania